The 2012 Oceania Handball Nations Cup was the eighth edition of the Oceania Handball Nations Cup, held from 22 to 23 June 2012 in Australia. It also acted as the qualifying competition for the 2013 World Men's Handball Championship, securing one vacancy for the World Championship.

Australia and New Zealand played a two-game series to determine the winner.

Overview

All times are local (UTC+10).

Game 1

Game 2

References

 Introduction on the International Handball Federation web page. 19 May, 2012
 Report on the International Handball Federation web page. 26 May, 2012
 Caleb Gahan will make his national handball debut at the 2012 Oceania Championships. Quest Newspapers. Logan Western Leader. 23 June 2012.

External links
Official website
Results at todor66.com

Oceania Handball Nations Cup
2012 Oceania Handball Nations Cup
Oceania Handball Championship
2012 in Australian sport
Sports competitions in Sydney
June 2012 sports events in Australia